Bayraklı railway station is a station on İZBAN's Northern Line in central Bayraklı, İzmir. The station consists of two side platforms serving two bi-directional tracks. An overhead mezzanine serves as both an overpass and ticket control area. 

Bayraklı station was originally opened on 10 October 1865 by the Smyrna Cassaba Railway.

Bus Connections
ESHOT

102 Alpaslan Mahallesi-Gümrük
162 Cengizhan-Gümrük
501 Halkapınar Metro-Çiçek Mahellesi
502 Cengizhan-Halkapınar Metro
504 F. Edip Baksi-Halkapınar Metro

References

Railway stations in İzmir Province
Railway stations opened in 2001
2001 establishments in Turkey
Bayraklı District